Phidolopora is a genus of bryozoans belonging to the family Phidoloporidae.

The genus has almost cosmopolitan distribution.

Species:

Phidolopora avicularis 
Phidolopora bartrumi 
Phidolopora chakra 
Phidolopora cyclops 
Phidolopora elongata 
Phidolopora labiata 
Phidolopora pacifica 
Phidolopora pacificoidea 
Phidolopora robusta 
Phidolopora trisinuata

References

Bryozoan genera